Cheshmeh Khani (also Romanized as Cheshmeh Khānī) is a village in Barez Rural District, Manj District, Lordegan County, Chaharmahal and Bakhtiari Province, Iran. At the 2006 census, its population was 427, in 83 families.

References 

Populated places in Lordegan County